The 1920–21 NCAA men's basketball season began in December 1920, progressed through the regular season and conference tournaments, and concluded in March 1921.

Rule changes
Previously, players could climb the wall to get closer to the basket for a shot.
 A new substitution rule allowed a player who left the game to re-enter it once. Previously, a player who left the game could not re-enter it.

Season headlines 

 In February 1943, the Helms Athletic Foundation retroactively selected Penn as its national champion for the 1920–21 season.
 In 1995, the Premo-Porretta Power Poll retroactively selected Missouri as its national champion for the 1920–21 season.

Conference membership changes

Regular season

Conference winners and tournaments 

NOTE: The Southern Intercollegiate Athletic Association did not have an official regular-season champion, but it sponsored the Southern Intercollegiate Athletic Association men's basketball tournament, whose champion claimed the mythical title of "Champions of the South."

Statistical leaders

Awards

Helms College Basketball All-Americans 

The practice of selecting a Consensus All-American Team did not begin until the 1928–29 season. The Helms Athletic Foundation later retroactively selected a list of All-Americans for the 1920–21 season.

Major player of the year awards 

 Helms Player of the Year: George Williams, Missouri (retroactive selection in 1944)

Coaching changes 

A number of teams changed coaches during the season and after it ended.

References